Cabin Fever is a 2016 American horror film directed by Travis Zariwny (under the pseudonym Travis Z) and written by Eli Roth. A remake of Roth's 2002 film of the same name and the fourth overall installment in the Cabin Fever franchise. The film stars Samuel Davis, Gage Golightly, Matthew Daddario, Nadine Crocker, and Dustin Ingram. The film was released on February 12, 2016, by IFC Midnight. Eli Roth, writer and director of the original film, acts as co-writer and executive producer. The film was poorly received by critics and underperformed at the box office.

Plot

A forest-dwelling hermit discovers his dog has died from a mysterious illness and is sprayed by its infected blood.  Five young friends, Paul, Karen, Bert, Jeff and Marcy have rented a cabin in the same woods for a week-long vacation. The group stops for supplies at Priddy's General Store. Dennis, the intellectually-disabled son of the store manager, unexpectedly bites Paul's hand.

Bert ventures into the woods with a rifle. Bert encounters and accidentally shoots the hermit. He panics when he realizes the hermit is infected with a disease and flees. He says nothing about the incident to his friends.

Later that evening, while the group hang out around a campfire, a stranger who calls himself Grim and his dog, Dr. Mambo, gatecrash their evening.

Later that night, the infected hermit comes to the cabin in search of help. Bert slams the door in his face and the desperate man tries to steal the group's vehicle. A conflict ensues between the hermit and the five friends, during which they accidentally cripple their car and set fire to the hermit. He runs off into the woods, presumably to his death.

The next day, Jeff and Bert head out in search of help. They encounter a farmer who offers to help them, but hastily leave when they discover that the hermit is her cousin. Meanwhile, Deputy Winston arrives at the cabin to investigate reports of the previous night's commotion. Paul explains things without mentioning the hermit's presumed death. Winston promises to send a tow truck before departing.

Dr. Mambo returns to the cabin without Grim and seemingly infected. He threatens Paul and Bert, before Marcy scares him off with the rifle.

While Paul and Karen make out, they discover that Karen is infected with the flesh-eating virus and her leg has started to decay. Fearful of contagion, the others lock her in the shed. Paul leaves on foot to find help, but the only people he encounters chase him away, mistaking him for a peeping Tom.

The following morning, the group's attempt to evacuate is botched when Karen vomits blood all over the interior of the car. Bert drives back to the general store alone and Jeff abandons everybody and flees to a remote shack. Marcy and Paul lament their poor chances of surviving and have sex, believing they won't live long enough to regret it. They later discover marks on Marcy's back that reveals she, too, is sick.

At the general store, Dennis bites Bert's hand just as he did with Paul. His father, Tommy, lashes out at Bert for exposing his son to the virus, and he and his friends chase Bert down in order to contain the disease. While once again searching for help, Paul encounters the severely-burnt hermit in the lake. Surprisingly, he is still alive and he attacks Paul, only for Paul to fend him off and finally kill him.

Marcy draws a bath and shaves her legs, causing the infected flesh to gruesomely peel from her body. She stumbles outside in distress and is mauled to death by Dr. Mambo.

Paul returns to the boat shed where Karen begs him to kill her. His gun is empty and since he's unable to finish the job of splitting her face with a shovel, Paul sets the shed on fire and watches in horror as Karen is completely burned alive. Bert makes it back to the cabin, but he is followed and shot dead by Tommy. Paul recovers Bert's rifle and guns down Tommy and his two accomplices. Paul escapes in Tommy's truck, but crashes it into a tree and explodes. Covered in blood, Paul stumbles upon a small campfire party attended by Deputy Winston. Winston receives a radio call from the sheriff ordering her to shoot Paul on sight. However, Paul convinces Winston to let him go instead.

The next morning, Jeff returns to the cabin. He finds the corpses of his friends and Tommy’s accomplices, and rejoices in having survived the ordeal himself, until he sees signs of the infection on his hand. He is then shot and killed by Deputy Winston with a sniper rifle. Paul succumbs to infection and drops dead in the woods where Dennis discovers his corpse. Back at the cabin, as the authorities and a hazmat crew clean up the scene, it’s revealed that Jeff’s corpse landed near the lake, which is now infected with his blood.

Cast
 Samuel Davis as Paul
 Gage Golightly as Karen
 Matthew Daddario as Jeff
 Nadine Crocker as Marcy
 Dustin Ingram as Bert
 Randy Schulman as Henry, Infected Hermit
 George Griffith as Cadwell, Store Owner
 Derrick R. Means as Dennis, The Boy With Mask 
 Louise Linton as Deputy Winston
 Timothy G. Zajaros as Grim With His Dog Doctor Mambo
 Aaron Trainor as Tommy 
 Jason Rouse as Fenster
 Benton Morris as Baily 
 Laura Kenny as Hog Lady
 Teresa Decher as Emily
 Travis Zariwny as Sheriff Lincoln

Production

In 2011, alongside the announcement of Cabin Fever: Patient Zero, a fourth film was revealed to be in development at Indomina and Hypotenuse Pictures, with both films expected to shoot back-to-back. Texas Chainsaw 3D screenwriters Adam Marcus and Debra Marcus were tapped to pen the script, entitled Cabin Fever: Outbreak, with a planned production start of Spring 2012 in the Dominican Republic. The initial plot served as direct sequel to Patient Zero and followed a doctor on a Caribbean island attempting to contain the virus.<ref>{{cite web|last=Orange|first=B|url=https://movieweb.com/cabin-fever-patient-zero-moves-forward-with-director-kaare-andrews/|title=Cabin Fever: Patient Zero' Moves Forward with Director Kaare Andrews|date=February 15, 2012|website=MovieWeb|accessdate=January 27, 2022}}</ref> However, story changes were made with the final iteration taking place on a cruise ship. Production for Patient Zero was delayed to August and then to October 2012, with no mention of any further updates on Outbreak. By May 2013, Voltage Pictures and Idomina proposed a trilogy of films following Patient Zero.

By April 2014, plans for Outbreak were scrapped altogether in favor of producing a remake of the original film. By this point, Indomina had moved on from the project, while Cassian Elwes and Evan Astrowsky boarded the film as producers. In October, Travis Zariwny, director of The Midnight Man and Intruder, was announced as director and would utilize the original script written by Eli Roth and Randy Pearlstein. That same month, Teen Wolf actress Gage Golightly, Dustin Ingram, Samuel Davis, Matthew Daddario, and Nadine Cocker joined the cast, while Chris Lemole and Tim Zajaros signed on to produce the film alongside Astrowsky, while Elwes and Roth would act as executive producers. Impressed with Zariwny's pitch, Roth decided to join the film, but had no involvement due to his obligations to South of Hell.

While using the original script from Roth and Pearlstein, Zariwny made his own changes to script; such as making the characters more likable, changed the deaths of the characters, incorporated elements Roth was not able to in the original, and removed the comedic aspects. Zariwny also trimmed the page count from 124 to only 92. In this version, the character of Deputy Winston is gender-swapped, this time played by Louise Linton, a frequent collaborator of Zariwny. The director opted to make this choice because he felt there was no other way to emulate the performance of Giuseppe Andrews, who portrayed the character in Cabin Fever and Cabin Fever 2: Spring Fever.

Principal photography took place in Portland, Oregon in October 2014.

Release
In September 2015, IFC Midnight acquired North American distribution rights to the film, The film was released in a limited release and through video on demand on February 12, 2016.

Critical reception
On Rotten Tomatoes, the film has a rare approval rating of 0% based on 28 reviews, with an average rating of 2.52/10. The site's critics' consensus reads: "No need for a quarantine -- enthusiasm for this inert remake is not contagious." On Metacritic, the film holds a rating of 14 out of 100, based on 7 critics, indicating "overwhelming dislike".

Geoff Berkshire of Variety gave the film a negative review, writing: "It's little surprise that Roth himself is the exec producer of this nearly beat-for-beat redo. Who else would feel as much passion for the middling material? And who better to ensure the copy does nothing to improve on the original? The silver lining of a day-and-date limited theatrical and VOD release is that there's no chance this repurposed dud duplicates the original's commercial performance." Glenn Kenny of The New York Times also gave the film a negative review, writing: "Who benefits from the existence of this film? Certainly not the largely bland ensemble of post-adolescent actors cast as the leads, who here can scarcely be called characters." Peter Bradshaw of The Guardian gave the film a score of 1/5 stars, writing: "There is no interesting new slant on this material: it’s just the same old stuff, being served up in a tired and cynical fashion, without anything inventive in the way of humour or fear." Martin Tsai of the Los Angeles Times wrote: "One criticism often lobbed against remakes is that they dumb down the originals. Cabin Fever'' … is guilty as charged."

Home media
The film was released on DVD and Blu-ray Disc on July 5, 2016. In Australia, it was released on April 28, 2016.

The film was released on DVD and Blu-Ray Disc on June 27, 2016 in UK and Ireland with the behind of the scenes feature.

References

External links
 
 
 

2016 films
2016 horror films
Remakes of American films
2010s English-language films
Films about viral outbreaks
Films set in forests
Films shot in Oregon
American science fiction horror films
Horror film remakes
Films produced by Eli Roth
Films with screenplays by Eli Roth
Films directed by Travis Zariwny
2010s American films